= Château Fougas =

Château in Nouvelle-Aquitaine, France

Coordinates: 45°03′39″N 0°32′34″W

Château Fougas is a château in Gironde, Nouvelle-Aquitaine, France. It was built in the 18th century. They currently make wines.
